Jamie Patrick McCunnie (born 15 April 1983 in Glasgow) is a Scottish footballer, who is currently the player-manager of Scottish Junior Football East Region Super League team Broughty Athletic. He was also the manager of Abertay University Men's 1st team for the 2019–20 season. His previous clubs include Dundee United, Ross County and Hartlepool United. He has represented Scotland at under-21 and B international levels.

Career
McCunnie began his senior career with Dundee United at youth level, signing for them professionally in 1999. Normally featuring as a right back at this stage of his career, he was given his first team début for United away to Hibernian in December 2000. Despite McCunnie being aged only 17 at the time, manager Alex Smith was sufficiently impressed by his performances to keep him as a regular first team player for the rest of that season, helping the club climb successfully out of relegation and reach a Scottish Cup semi-final. McCunnie's successful season culminated in him signing a new three-year contract with the Tannadice club, while also making his début for Scotland under-21 side against Poland.

At this time, McCunnie was rated as one of the best young players in Scottish football. However, despite featuring regularly for Dundee United over the next two seasons and becoming captain of the Scotland under-21s, he began to lose consistency from his form. Ian McCall had become manager of Dundee United early in 2003, and seemingly unimpressed by the player's attitude, soon made it known to McCunnie that he was willing to dispense with his services. The somewhat surprised player found himself offloaded to First Division side Ross County, where his former mentor Alex Smith was now manager, in June 2003. McCunnie spent two seasons playing for the Dingwall club, during which time he was converted from right back to a defensive midfield role. His Ross County contract was due to expire in 2005 and he was keen to seek a return to a higher level of football, with a move to English football a distinct possibility. He was widely expected to join Cardiff City following a successful trial, but the move ultimately fell through, and a trial with Gillingham was also unproductive. Instead, McCunnie was able to secure himself a return to the top flight of Scottish football, signing for Dunfermline Athletic in August 2005. He has established himself as a regular first team player, despite an injury absence early in his Dunfermline career, resulting from an assault outside a Dundee nightclub.

McCunnie joined Hartlepool United on 15 June 2007 on a free transfer, preferring the move to a contract extension, which he was widely expected to sign. On 6 May 2009, he was released by Hartlepool after being deemed surplus to requirements. He signed for East Fife for the 2009–10 season, but was released once the season had finished.

He then moved to Iceland, playing with Haukar, Grindavik and Íþróttafélag Reykjavíkur. In March 2012, he returned to Scotland and signed for Stirling Albion.

After leaving Stirling Albion, McCunnie signed for Dundee-based junior club Broughty Athletic. He took over as the club's caretaker manager in August 2017, following the resignation of previous manager Keith Gibson, then was appointed as interim for a second time in the same season after the resignation of Gibsons successor, Jim Finlayson in January 2018.

On 28 February 2018 McCunnie became first team manager at Broughty Athletic.

Career statistics
After 25 October 2008

References

External links

1983 births
Footballers from Glasgow
Living people
Association football fullbacks
Association football midfielders
Scottish footballers
Scotland under-21 international footballers
Scotland B international footballers
Dundee United F.C. players
Ross County F.C. players
Dunfermline Athletic F.C. players
Hartlepool United F.C. players
ÍR men's football players
Grindavík men's football players
Stirling Albion F.C. players
Expatriate footballers in Iceland
Scottish expatriate footballers
Scottish expatriate sportspeople in Iceland
Scottish Premier League players
Scottish Football League players
English Football League players
East Fife F.C. players
Broughty Athletic F.C. players
Scottish Junior Football Association managers
Scottish football managers
Úrvalsdeild karla (football) players
Broughty Athletic F.C. managers